The Snow Hill Normal and Industrial Institute, also known as the Colored Industrial and Literary Institute of Snow Hill, was a historic African American school in Snow Hill, Alabama. It was founded in 1893 by Dr. William James Edwards, a graduate of Tuskegee University, and began in a one-room log cabin.  The school grew over time to include a campus of 27 buildings, a staff of 35, and over 400 students.  The school was operated as a private school for African-American children until Dr. Edward's retirement in 1924, when it became a public school operated by the State of Alabama.  The school closed in 1973, after the desegregation of the Wilcox County school system.  Out of the original 27 buildings, only eight survive today.  They range in architectural style from Queen Anne to Craftsman and include the founder's home, five teachers' cottages, and the library.  The National Snow Hill Alumni Association and the local Snow Hill Institute supporters determined to save the remaining structures in 1980. In June 1980, Dr. Edwards' granddaughter and Snow Hill alumna Consuela Lee Moorehead reopened the school as the Springtree/Snow Hill Institute for the Performing Arts and ran after-school and summer programs for local students. The art institute continued to run until 2003 when Moorehead's declining health caused her to close down the school. The school was listed on the National Register of Historic Places on February 24, 1995.

William James Edwards
The school's founder, William James Edwards (born 1869) is buried by the school. He authored Twenty-Five Years in the Black Belt about his experiences. In the book, Edwards identifies as alumni of the school:
 Emmanuel McDuffie, founder and principal of Lauringburg Normal and Industrial Institute in Laurinburg, North Carolina
 Rev. Emmanuel M. Brown, a faculty member at Street Manual Training School in Richmond, Alabama
John W. Brister who established a prize at Snow Hill Institute
 Waverley Turner Carmichael the "Poet of Snow Hill".

References

External links

Historical Marker Database

National Register of Historic Places in Wilcox County, Alabama
School buildings on the National Register of Historic Places in Alabama
Historic districts in Wilcox County, Alabama
Defunct schools in Alabama
African-American history of Alabama
Queen Anne architecture in Alabama
American Craftsman architecture in Alabama
Properties on the Alabama Register of Landmarks and Heritage
Historically segregated African-American schools in Alabama
Historic districts on the National Register of Historic Places in Alabama
1893 establishments in Alabama